37th parallel may refer to:

37th parallel north, a circle of latitude in the Northern Hemisphere
37th parallel south, a circle of latitude in the Southern Hemisphere